Saint Mary's University (SMU) is a formerly Catholic, public university located in Halifax, Nova Scotia, Canada. The school is best known for having nationally leading programs in business and chemistry.

History

Founding

Saint Mary's is the second oldest English-speaking and first Roman Catholic initiated university in Canada. The Roman Catholic church founded Saint Mary's College in Halifax, Nova Scotia in 1802. It was established in Glebe House, on the corner of Spring Garden Road and Barrington Street, with the aim of extending educational opportunities for Catholic youth and training candidates for the clergy.

In 1840 the Nova Scotia Legislature bestowed the degree granting charter to Saint Mary's and eleven years later granted the university formal legal status. Saint Mary's collapsed in 1883, but was revived in 1903 by Cornelius O'Brien, then Archbishop of Halifax. It reopened as a high school in a new campus on Windsor Street, near the junction with Quinpool Road.

In 1913 the Christian Brothers of Ireland were asked by the Archdiocese of Halifax to direct the college and academic programs. Degree-granting resumed in 1918. With this change of leadership the university's reputation thrived as a liberal arts institution and expanded its undergraduate programs, with the most notable being the Faculty of Commerce in 1934 (now known as the Sobey School of Business), which was the first of its kind in Canada. In 1940 the Upper Province of the Society of Jesus (the Jesuits) was invited to succeed the Christian Brothers as both administrators and faculty. A Roll of Honour at St. Mary's University is dedicated to students of St. Mary's College who volunteered for the Second World War.

Expansion

Due to rapid growth the college was fast outgrowing the Windsor Street campus, and so the Gorsebrook Golf Club was purchased in 1943. Construction of the new campus was delayed by wartime steel shortages. The relocation was completed in 1952. The former college building was rented by the Halifax school board and the overcrowded Saint Patrick's Boys' School was relocated there. The modern Saint Patrick's High School opened on the site in 1954 and operated until 2007. The old Saint Mary's College building was rented for a time by the Maritime Conservatory of Music before it was sold to the city in 1968 and demolished to make way for the expansion of Saint Patrick's.

The next 30 years would see the university flourish under Jesuit supervision, with such advancements as the formal recognition of the "college" as a university in 1952 and purchasing the first computer in Atlantic Canada (a Royal McBee LGP-30) in 1959. In 1970 the Jesuits formally incorporated the university under the "Acts of Incorporation" which gave all administrative and academic duties to the Board of Governors and Academic Senate, making Saint Mary's a secular institution. Saint Mary's University was established by the Saint Mary's University Act, 1970.

High school

In 1951, the High School moved with Saint Mary's College to the Robie Street campus where they occupied three classrooms on the second floor of the new McNally building. The High School offered an embellished junior matriculation for grades 9,10,11 and many of the boys entered Saint Mary's directly upon graduation although some went to Saint Patrick's or Queen Elizabeth to attend grade 12.
The Jesuit influence which incorporated the principles of a sound mind and a sound body meant that everyone who attended the high school became an active participant in intramural hockey, football and basketball.

With fewer than 100 students enrolled in any one year, developing teams to represent Saint Mary's University High School on the extracurricular level seemed daunting but with the astute coaching of the future Hall of Fame coach, Frank "Mr Basketball" Baldwin, success was achieved. Saint Mary's High School "A" and "B" basketball teams won three straight Halifax City Championships. Back to back Provincial Headmasters Championships by the "A" team in 1960-61 and 1961-62 epitomized the rich athletic tradition cultivated by the Jesuits. This accomplishment was even more significant when you consider that the school drew its athletes from fewer than 100 students.

The Saint Mary's University High School closed in 1963. A plaque detailing the history of the high school was placed at the entrance to the McNally building in 1988 as part of a Twenty Five year reunion.

Modern history
Since then the university has continued expansion of its academic programs with the most notable being the offerings of doctoral level studies in astronomy and business and the accreditation of the business school with the AACSB (Association to Advance Collegiate Schools of Business). At the same time the university has expanded its campus facilities with noted additions of the Burke-Gaffney Observatory in the 1970s and the Sobey Building in 1998. In 1992, the Faculty of Commerce was renamed the Sobey School of Business, after Frank H. Sobey, founder of Sobeys. In 2001, SMU's Huskies were the first Atlantic Canadian university team to advance to the world finals in the ACM International Collegiate Programming Contest World Finals.

In early 1994 workers renovating the Rice Residence found that an exterior wall on the 16th storey was dangerously unstable and posed a hazard to those walking below. Over 250 students were moved to the Halifax Hilton, which had recently gone out of business, which was used as a temporary residence while repairs were carried out.

In the 1990s the provincial government sought to cut funding to Nova Scotia's universities. Teacher education programs were consolidated at Mount Saint Vincent University, Acadia University, and Université Sainte-Anne, while the education faculties at Saint Mary's and Dalhousie were wound up and the 140-year-old Nova Scotia Teachers College was closed altogether. The Saint Mary's education program ended in the spring of 1996. It was not forcibly closed by the province, but the minister of education stated that he would only licence teachers who had graduated from the three approved universities.

In 2013 the Saint Mary's High School basketball achievement was recognized at the Hall of Fame events and a plaque containing the names of all of the players who represented the school on the 1959 - 1962. The plaque can be seen in the Tower at Saint Mary's University.

Faculties 
Saint Mary's comprises four faculties:

 Arts
 Dean: Dr. Mary I. Ingraham
 Sobey School of Business
 Dean: Dr. Harjeet Bhabra  
 Science
 Dean: Dr. Lori Francis (Acting)
 Graduate Studies and Research
Dean: Dr. Adam Sarty

Campus

The Saint Mary's 80-acre (32 hectare) campus is located in the south end, not far from Downtown Halifax and just down the road from Dalhousie University. Major buildings include:

Over the past decade many of the older buildings on campus have been substantially renovated. In March 2005, Saint Mary's started the “Science Building Renewal Project” which was estimated to cost $100 million. This project is part of the larger project the “University’s Strategic Directions and Academic Plan” which was developed in consultation with students, faculty and local citizens in order to meet both the needs of the university and local community over the next decade. The project focused on modernising and expanding the science faculty's resources, generally renewing the architectural, mechanical and electrical infrastructures of the Science Building, providing additional office and research space to faculty members, improving lab layout, and integrating with future campus developments.

The university completed construction of the Atrium and Global Commons project in late 2009. The three-storey $17.5 million complex links the Science Centre, the Burke Building and the Patrick Power Library. The space features a common area, theatre style classrooms, offices and study spaces. The project also features advanced green environmental technologies, has fully integrated hard and Wi-Fi systems, a food outlet and a three-storey green wall.

The 62-year-old McNally Building recently underwent a $27 million renewal thanks in large part to the Canadian governments Infrastructure Renewal Programme. Most of the interior of the four floor, four wing complex was rebuilt.

Construction of the new Homburg Centre for Health and Wellness began in October 2010. This complex, an extension of the Tower Fitness Centre, houses new space for community health and wellness activities and is the new home for the Centre for the Study of Sport and Health. The $8 million project was funded by a donation from real estate developer and manager Richard Homburg and the university's capital campaign. It opened in 2012.

960 Tower Road, a three-storey, 28,000 square foot building, opened in 2013. It is home to the English as a second language program as well as the Sobey School Business Development Centre, which moved back to campus from a downtown location. The university stirred controversy when it demolished the former Halifax Infants’ Home in 2014.

SMU's new Dauphinee Centre ice arena sits on the site of the 54 year old Alumni Arena. Made possible through generous donations from the estate of the late alumni Bob Dauphinee and SMU parents Glen and Nancy Holmes. The Dauphinee Centre is connected to the Homburg Centre for Health and Wellness, by a pedway and features an NHL regulation ice surface, heated viewing gallery, community meeting rooms, canteen facilities and capacity of 1200 fans.

Construction is presently underway on the new $30-million, Entrepreneurship and Innovation HUB at the southern edge of the campus. 42,700-square-foot building will be integrated with the Loyola Academic Complex and the Sobey Building. University administration anticipate completion of the building by 2023.

Legacy
The Saint Mary's University mace shows the religious background of this now secular institution. There are crests for the Archdiocese of Halifax. the LaSalle Christian Brothers, the Irish Christian Brothers and the Jesuits.

On 27 May 2002, Canada Post issued "Saint Mary's University, 1802-2002" as part of the Canadian Universities series, based upon a design by Steven Slipp, based on photographs by James Steeves and on an illustration by Bonnie Ross. The 48¢ stamps are perforated 13.5 and were printed by Ashton-Potter Canada Limited.

In June 2021, Saint Mary's University announced a rebranding of its logo, backgrounds and tag lines.

Reputation

The annual Maclean's rankings evaluate universities on 13 performance measures. Maclean's evaluates universities in three categories, with Saint Mary's being ranked amongst other universities the publication categorized as "primarily undergraduate" institutions. In Maclean's 2023 rankings, Saint Mary's was ranked third amongst 19 "primarily undergraduate" universities in Canada.

The Canadian University Report is conducted annually by The Globe and Mail, and reflects the opinions of more than 33,000 undergraduate students across the country as gathered in a student satisfaction survey. Saint Mary's University is in the "small" category of along with 15 other universities with enrolment between 4,000 and 12,000 students.

The Canadian University Report stated that overall student satisfaction had a grade of B+ in 2013, the same as in 2012, A− in quality of teaching, A− in class size, A− in buildings and facilities and improvement shown in six key categories.

Student life

Huskies football

The Huskies won back-to-back Canadian University Football Championships (2001 & 2002), the third university to do so (after Manitoba and Western).

Huskies hockey
In 2010, the men Huskies won their first CIS University Hockey Cup by defeating the Alberta Golden Bears 3–2 in overtime.

Saint Mary's University Students' Association
The Saint Mary's University Students' Association (SMUSA) is the official representation of the students of Saint Mary's University. The association was incorporated in 1966, however, unofficially has represented students for many years previous. The Association main offices are located on the top floor of the student centre at the heart of campus. 

SMUSA provides such services as a safe drive program, tutor database, online book exchange, health and dental plans and the Gorsebrook Lounge. SMUSA also operates many departments that help in the mission of serving students and making their lives at Saint Mary's the best possible. These departments include the volunteer department, events and programming, marketing and communications, the yearbook, the information desk and husky patrol.

The Saint Mary's University Students Association is represented federally by the Canadian Alliance of Student Associations and provincially by StudentsNS (formerly ANSSA. 

SMUSA came under scrutiny after their first-year student orientation in 2013. A traditional chant promoting non-consensual sex with underage girls was posted on Instagram, and then picked up by traditional media. Student union president Jared Perry resigned as president of Students Nova Scotia but stayed on as head of the university's student association.  Saint Mary's University Communications manager Steve Proctor opined that "nobody actually doing the cheer believed in what it was" but the Avalon Sexual Assault Centre reported that it received calls from survivors specifically regarding the cheer. Peter MacKay, a federal cabinet minister from Nova Scotia, also criticized the chant as "offensive and dangerous". A review conducted in the following months detailed a plan to require sensitivity training for the frosh leaders and to discuss informed consent with the incoming students. The university also changed the name "Orientation Week" to "Welcome Week" for 2014.

Saint Mary's University Student Athletic Clubs
Saint Mary's University is home to numerous student based sports clubs that provide club members with the opportunity to get involved in a variety of athletic activities.
Clubs include, but are not limited to:
 Cheerleading 
 Dance (Saint Mary's University Dance Club)
 Equestrian (Saint Mary's Equestrian Team)
 Karate (Saint Mary's University Shotokan Karate Club) 
 Men's Baseball (League) 
 Men's Rugby Club (League) 
 Men's Field Lacrosse (League) 
 Men's & Women's Curling (League) 
 Ringette 
 Taiko Drumming (SMU Taiko) 
 Tennis 
 Women's Field Hockey (League)

Notable alumni
Mayann Francis, former Lieutenant Governor of Nova Scotia -first African Nova Scotian to hold title ; Author
 Alan Abraham, former Lieutenant Governor of Nova Scotia
 Brian Ahern, producer for Anne Murray, Emmylou Harris, Johnny Cash
 Steve Armitage, CBC Sportscaster
 John William Ashe, President of the United Nations General Assembly, 68th session and former ambassador to the United Nations for Antigua and Barbuda.
 Jackie Barrett, Special Olympics Powerlifter, amassed 15 Powerlifting medals at four Special Olympics World Games appearances
 Micah Brown, United States national American football team and international football player
 Noah Cantor, Canadian Football League player
 Karen Casey, Nova Scotia MLA for Colchester North
 Kori Cheverie, the first female full-time assistant coach in Canadian Interuniversity Sport men's hockey history.
 Zach Churchill, Nova Scotia MLA for Yarmouth
 Louis Comeau, member of Parliament, entrepreneur and former CEO of Nova Scotia Power
 Patrick H. Curran, former Chief Judge of the Provincial Court of Nova Scotia
 Chris d'Entremont Nova Scotia MLA for Argyle
 Mal Davis, former National Hockey League player
 Terry Donahoe, former leader of the Nova Scotia Progressive Conservative Party
Miguel Figueroa, political activist, former leader of the Communist Party of Canada and of the Figueroa v Canada case.
 Chris Flynn, Canadian Football Hall of Famer, 3 time Hec Crighton Trophy winner
 Wayne Gaudet, Nova Scotia MLA for Clare
 Glenn Graham, Celtic musician
 Paul Hollingsworth, CTV Atlantic newscaster and TSN reporter
 Don Johnson, president of the Canadian Amateur Hockey Association and former hockey player and coach with Saint Mary's
 Andy Jones, comedian
 Peter J. Kelly, former Mayor of Halifax, Nova Scotia
 Robert P. Kelly, former CEO of the Bank of New York Mellon
 Terry Kelly, CM, blind musician
 Joseph Phillip Kennedy, Chief Justice of the Supreme Court of Nova Scotia
 Becky Kent, Nova Scotia MLA for Cole Harbour – Eastern Passage
 Steven Laffoley, educator and author of creative nonfiction and fiction
 John MacDonell, Nova Scotia MLA for Hants East
 Jasmine R. Marcelin, physician
 Terry Mercer, Canadian Senator for Northend Halifax
 Wilfred Moore, Canadian Senator for Stanhope St./Bluenose
 Steve Morley, CFL Player and former NFL Player
 William Njoku, basketball player who played professionally for 10 years for various clubs in Europe
 Justin Palardy, CFL Player (Winnipeg Blue Bombers)
 Gerald Regan, former Premier of Nova Scotia
 Dave Stala, CFL player (Hamilton Tigercats)
 Brody Steele, professional wrestler, former Strongman competitor
 Mat Whynott, Nova Scotia MLA for Hammonds Plains – Upper Sackville
 Cherno Omar Barry, Vice-Chancellor of the International Open University

Saint Mary's University Academic Senate
The Saint Mary's University Academic Senate is the part of a bicameral university governance structure responsible for academic decisions at the university. It is paired with a board of governors responsible for administrative and financial decisions. The Senate has ten ex-officio members: the president, vice-presidents, deans, registrar, director of student services, director of continuing education, and university librarian.  Fifteen faculty members are elected to three year terms and five students are elected by the general university population to one year terms.

Function
The academic senate is governed by the Saint Mary's University Act and subject to the powers of the university's Board and is responsible for the educational policy of the university in addition to:

 May create, maintain and discontinue such faculties, departments, schools or institutes and establish such chairs as it may determine and may fix the duties of those employed therein
 May recommend to the Board the affiliation or discontinuance of the affiliation of or with other universities
 May determine courses of study, admission standards, qualifications for diplomas, certificates and degrees, examinations, scholarships and bursaries and may issue university calendars and other official publications
 Shall be responsible for the library
 Shall be responsible for student discipline
 May create such committees as it deems necessary or useful
 May make regulations governing the matters that are assigned to it by this Section

See also

 Canadian government scientific research organizations
 Canadian Interuniversity Sport
 Canadian industrial research and development organizations
 Canadian university scientific research organizations
 Higher education in Nova Scotia
 List of Jesuit sites
 List of universities in Nova Scotia
 Master of Management: Co-operatives and Credit Unions
 Saint Mary's Huskies

References

External links

 
 Saint Mary's University Students' Association
 Saint Mary's University Sports Clubs
 Saint Mary's University Shotokan Karate Club

 
Universities in Nova Scotia
Educational institutions established in 1802
2011 Canada Winter Games
Catholic universities and colleges in Canada
1802 establishments in Nova Scotia